Ghator is a town located in the Punjab province of Pakistan. It is located in Faisalabad District at 31°12'0N 73°11'0E with an altitude of 175 metres (577 feet). Neighbouring settlements include Rurki and Manak.

References

Cities and towns in Faisalabad District